Kerry Hannon (born October 29, 1960) is an American author whose writings focus on careers, entrepreneurship and personal finance.

Biography
Hannon was born in Pittsburgh, Pennsylvania. She is a graduate of Duke University.

She is a senior columnist and on-air expert at Yahoo Finance and a workplace futurist. Kerry is a former columnist and contributor for The New York Times, MarketWatch, and Forbes. She is a former personal finance, entrepreneurship and work columnist for the PBS website, Next Avenue (nextavenue.org). Hannon is a former AARP Work and Job's expert columnist.

She speaks on the topics of personal finance, retirement, job search, career transitions, and women and financial security.

Hannon is a member of the board of visitors at Shady Side Academy in Pittsburgh, Pennsylvania.

On July 4, 1992, she married Cliff Hackel, a Peabody, Dupont and Emmy Award-winning documentary producer, director, and editor.

Publications
Trees in a Circle: The Teec Nos Pos Story (2000), a non-fiction saga of an American Indian trading post
Ten Minute Guide to Retirement for Women (MacMillan Publishing, 1996)
Suddenly Single: Money Skills for Divorcees and Widows (John Wiley & Sons, 1998)
 Getting Started In Estate Planning (John Wiley & Sons, 2000)
 What's Next?: Finding Your Passion and Your Dream Job (Chronicle Books, 2010)
Great Jobs for Everyone 50+: Finding Work That Keeps You Happy and Healthy ... And Pays the Bills (John Wiley & Sons, 2012)
What's Next?: Finding Your Passion and Your Dream Job in Your Forties, Fifties and Beyond (John Wiley & Sons, 2015)
Love Your Job The New Rules for Career Happiness (John Wiley & Sons, 2015)
Finding The Job You Want After 50 for Dummies (For Dummies, 2015)
Great Jobs for Everyone 50 +: Finding Work That Keeps You Happy And Healthy...and Pays The Bills (Wiley, 2017)
Money Confidence: Really Smart Financial Moves for Newly Single Women (Post Hill Press, 2017)
Never Too Old to Get Rich: The Entrepreneur's Guide to Starting a Business Mid-Life (Wiley, 2019)
Great Pajama Jobs: Your Complete Guide to Working From Home (Wiley, 2020)
  In Control at 50+: How to Succeed in The New World of Work (McGraw Hill, 2022)

References

American columnists
American finance and investment writers
Living people
1960 births
Shady Side Academy alumni
American women columnists
21st-century American women